The 1985 Volvo International was a men's tennis tournament played on outdoor hard courts at the Stratton Mountain Resort in Stratton Mountain, Vermont, United States, and was part of the 1985 Nabisco Grand Prix. It was the 13th edition of the tournament and was held from August 5 through August 12, 1985. First-seeded John McEnroe won the singles title and earned $40,000 first-prize money.

Finals

Singles

 John McEnroe defeated  Ivan Lendl 7–6(7–4), 6–2
 It was McEnroe's 6th singles title of the year and the 65th of his career.

Doubles

 Scott Davis /  David Pate defeated  Ken Flach /  Robert Seguso 3–6, 7–6, 7–6
 It was Davis' 3rd title of the year and the 6th of his career. It was Pate's 2nd title of the year and the 3rd of his career.

See also
 Lendl–McEnroe rivalry

References

External links
 ITF – tournament details

 
Volvo International
Volvo International
Volvo International
Volvo International